Tull Branch is a  long second-order tributary to Marshyhope Creek in Caroline County, Maryland.  This is the only stream of this name in the United States.

Course

Watershed
Tull Branch drains  of area, receives about 44.5 in/year of precipitation, and is about 10.31% forested.

See also
List of Maryland rivers

References

Rivers of Maryland
Rivers of Caroline County, Maryland
Tributaries of the Nanticoke River